Sunburn is a 1999 comedy-drama film directed by Nelson Hume and starring Cillian Murphy, Paloma Baeza, and Barry Ward. The film is about a group of young Irish people who spend the summer in the United States.

Cast 
 Cillian Murphy as Davin McDerby
 Paloma Baeza as Aideen Higgins
 Barry Ward as Robert Fiske
 Ingeborga Dapkunaite as Carolyn Kramer
 Sinead Keenan as Margaret
 Aidan Kelly as Raymond McDerby
 Michael Liebman as Billy Conlin

Reception
The film has received positive reviews with Variety describing the film as 'Nelson Hume's assured feature debut is spot-on in its portrayal of work-and-play summers of young students visiting the U.S.'.

References

External links 
 https://www.imdb.com/title/tt0168199/

1999 films
1999 comedy-drama films
American comedy-drama films
1990s English-language films
1990s American films